Protambulyx is a genus of moths in the family Sphingidae first described by Walter Rothschild and Karl Jordan in 1903.

Species
Protambulyx astygonus (Boisduval 1875)
Protambulyx carteri Rothschild & Jordan 1903
Protambulyx euryalus Rothschild & Jordan 1903
Protambulyx eurycles (Herrich-Schaffer 1854)
Protambulyx goeldii Rothschild & Jordan 1903
Protambulyx ockendeni Rothschild & Jordan 1903
Protambulyx strigilis (Linnaeus 1771)
Protambulyx sulphurea Rothschild & Jordan 1903

Gallery

References

 
Ambulycini
Sphingidae of South America
Moths of South America
Moth genera
Taxa named by Walter Rothschild
Taxa named by Karl Jordan